Ibrahim Al-Harbi (born 26 July 1995) is a Saudi Arabian professional footballer who plays as a midfielder for Al-Arabi.

Club career
Al-Harbi started his career at Al-Ansar and made his debut in the 2015–16 season. During the 2017–18 season, Al-Harbi helped Al-Ansar finish fourth and earn promotion to the MS League. On 10 October 2020, Al-Harbi joined Al-Fayha on a three-year contract. He scored 5 times in 32 appearances and helped Al-Fayha finish second and earn promotion to the Pro League. On 26 January 2022, Al-Harbi joined Al-Jabalain on loan. On 24 July 2022, Al-Harbi joined First Division side Al-Arabi.

Honours
Al-Fayha
MS League runner-up: 2020–21

References

External links
 
 

Living people
1995 births
People from Medina
Association football midfielders
Saudi Arabian footballers
Al-Ansar FC (Medina) players
Al-Fayha FC players
Al-Jabalain FC players
Al-Arabi SC (Saudi Arabia) players
Saudi Second Division players
Saudi First Division League players
Saudi Professional League players